Hubert Ira Davis Jr. (born May 17, 1970) is an American college basketball coach and former professional player who is the head coach of the North Carolina Tar Heels men's team. Before his coaching career, Davis played for North Carolina from 1988–1992 and in the National Basketball Association (NBA) for the New York Knicks, Toronto Raptors, Dallas Mavericks, Washington Wizards, Detroit Pistons, and New Jersey Nets from 1992 to 2004. He holds the franchise single-season three point field goal shooting percentage records for both the Knicks and the Mavericks. He is the nephew of Walter Davis, another former Tar Heel and NBA player.

Davis served as an assistant coach for the Tar Heels from 2012 until his elevation to head coach in 2021 following the retirement of Roy Williams.

Early life and education 
Davis attended Lake Braddock Secondary School in Burke, Virginia, averaging 28.0 points per game his senior year. He attended the same high school as future Tar Heel women's soccer great and Olympic medalist Mia Hamm. He went on to the University of North Carolina, where he holds the record for the highest career three-point percentage in school history. In his junior year, he helped lead the team to its first Final Four appearance since winning the national championship in 1982. Davis graduated in 1992 with a degree in Criminal Justice, after averaging 21.4 points per game in his senior season.

NBA career 
The New York Knicks selected Davis with the 20th overall pick in the 1992 NBA draft. He made the winning free throws after Hue Hollins called a disputed foul against Scottie Pippen in Game 5 of the 1994 Eastern Conference semifinals against the Chicago Bulls, giving the Knicks an 87–86 win (the Knicks went on to win the series in seven games).

Davis remained with New York for four years, and was traded to the Toronto Raptors before the 1996–97 season. After Toronto, Davis spent time with the Dallas Mavericks, Washington Wizards, Detroit Pistons, and New Jersey Nets. Davis played his final NBA game in 2004, finishing with career averages of 8.2 points, 1.5 rebounds and 1.7 assists per game. Davis's nearly 44.1% NBA career three-point shot percentage ranks him second behind Steve Kerr.

Sports analyst 

Following his playing career, Davis began working for ESPN as a college basketball analyst in the 2007–2008 season. During his time at ESPN, he served as a studio analyst for the network's coverage of college basketball and was a panelist on College Gameday. He left ESPN to return to Chapel Hill as an assistant coach following the 2011–2012 season.

Coaching career

North Carolina assistant coach
Prior to the 2012–2013 season, UNC head coach Roy Williams hired Davis as an assistant. Davis also served as head coach of UNC's junior varsity basketball team, one of the only junior varsity teams remaining in college basketball. UNC's junior varsity program is a long-standing program tradition, and several former JV players have gone on to be walk-ons for the varsity team.

Davis was on the bench for the Tar Heels  2017 NCAA Men's Basketball tournament run that concluded with a 71–65 win over Gonzaga in the National Championship game.

North Carolina head coach
Following the retirement of longtime Tar Heel head coach Roy Williams, Davis was named the 19th head coach in program history, and became the first African-American to lead the program. The move was initially met with some criticism, as Davis had never been a head coach at any level. Despite this,  Williams had been grooming him for a head coaching job much in the same way that Dean Smith had mentored Williams during Williams' time as a Tar Heel assistant coach from 1978 to 1988.

Davis recorded his first career win in his first game as head coach. The Tar Heels beat Loyola (MD) 83–67 at home in the Dean Smith Center to open the season. On February 21, 2022, Davis's Tar Heels defeated Louisville to give the first-year head coach his 20th victory of the year. Davis became the fourth ACC head coach to win twenty games in his debut season in the past twenty-five years with the victory. Previous Tar Heel coaches Matt Doherty (2000–01), and Bill Guthridge (1997–98) are two of the other three coaches to reach the twenty-win mark in their debut seasons, winning 26 and 34 games respectively. Davis's Tar Heels capped off a 23–8 regular season with a 94–81 victory over Duke in Mike Krzyzewski's final home game at Cameron Indoor Stadium.

Davis's Tar Heels went 1–1 in his first ACC tournament as head coach, and earned an Eastern regional 8th seed in the 2022 NCAA tournament. After cruising to a 95–63 win over 9-seed Marquette in the first round, the Tar Heels upset the East's number one seed, the Baylor Bears, in the second round. The Tar Heels hung on and won the game 93–86 in overtime after losing a 25-point second-half lead. The victory secured Davis's first sweet sixteen berth as head coach and the school's 30th overall, the most by any program in Division I history. After a 73–66 victory over 4th seed UCLA Bruins in the Sweet Sixteen, Davis and his Tar Heels advanced to the Elite Eight where they defeated the St. Peter’s Peacocks 69–49 to earn a trip to the Final Four. In the national semifinal game, the Tar Heels matched up against arch rivals Duke for the first time in NCAA tournament history. The Tar Heels defeated the Blue Devils 81-77 in what was Duke coach Mike Krzyzewski's final game. However, in the national championship game, Davis' Tar Heels were defeated by Kansas, 72-69.

Due to the Tar Heels' success in his first year as head coach, Davis became one of the few college basketball figures to have gone to a Final Four as a player (1991), an assistant coach (2016 and 2017), and as a head coach (2022).

Personal life 
Davis and his wife Leslie have three children: Elijah, Bobbie Grace and Micah. As of the 2021–22 season, Elijah plays college basketball for the University of Lynchburg. At the press conference announcing his hiring as the UNC basketball coach, when asked about being the first black UNC head coach, Davis caused public debate by stating he's proud to be African-American but also proud that his wife is white. Davis is a devout Christian.

Career statistics

NBA

Regular season

|-
| style="text-align:left;"| 
| style="text-align:left;"| New York
| 50 || 2 || 16.8 || .438 || .316 || .796 || 1.1 || 1.7 || .4 || .1 || 5.4
|-
| style="text-align:left;"| 
| style="text-align:left;"| New York
| 56 || 27 || 23.8 || .471 || .402 || .825 || 1.2 || 2.9 || .7 || .1 || 11.0
|-
| style="text-align:left;"| 
| style="text-align:left;"| New York
| style="background:#CFECEC; width:1em"|82* || 4 || 20.7 || .480 || .455 || .808 || 1.3 || 1.8 || .4 || .1 || 10.0
|-
| style="text-align:left;"| 
| style="text-align:left;"| New York
| 74 || 14 || 24.0 || .486 || .476 || .868 || 1.7 || 1.4 || .4 || .1 || 10.7
|-
| style="text-align:left;"| 
| style="text-align:left;"| Toronto
| 36 || 0 || 17.3 || .402 || .229 || .739 || 1.1 || .9 || .3 || .1 || 5.0
|-
| style="text-align:left;"| 
| style="text-align:left;"| Dallas
| 81 || 30 || 29.4 || .456 || .439 || .836 || 2.1 || 1.9 || .5 || .1 || 11.1
|-
| style="text-align:left;"| 
| style="text-align:left;"| Dallas
| style="background:#CFECEC; width:1em"|50* || 21 || 27.6 || .438 || .451 || .880 || 1.7 || 1.8 || .4 || .1 || 9.1
|-
| style="text-align:left;"| 
| style="text-align:left;"| Dallas
| 79 || 15 || 23.0 || .468 || style="background:#CFECEC; width:1em"|.491* || .870 || 1.7 || 1.8 || .3 || .0 || 7.4
|-
| style="text-align:left;"| 
| style="text-align:left;"| Dallas
| 51 || 7 || 24.7 || .443 || .436 || .854 || 2.1 || 1.2 || .6 || .0 || 7.3
|-
| style="text-align:left;"| 
| style="text-align:left;"| Washington
| 15 || 11 || 28.7 || .479 || .526 || .905 || 2.0 || 3.3 || .4 || .0 || 10.2
|-
| style="text-align:left;"| 
| style="text-align:left;"| Washington
| 51 || 17 || 24.2 || .448 || .452 || .762 || 1.5 || 2.1 || .5 || .1 || 7.2
|-
| style="text-align:left;"| 
| style="text-align:left;"| Detroit
| 43 || 1 || 7.6 || .392 || .333 || .833 || .8 || .7 || .1 || .0 || 1.8
|-
| style="text-align:left;"| 
| style="text-align:left;"| Detroit
| 3 || 0 || 7.7 || .000 || .000 || – || .0 || .3 || .0 || .0 || .0
|-
| style="text-align:left;"| 
| style="text-align:left;"| New Jersey
| 14 || 0 || 3.9 || .111 || – || 1.000 || .6 || .2 || .1 || .0 || .3
|- class="sortbottom"
| style="text-align:center;" colspan="2"| Career
| 685 || 149 || 22.1 || .458 || .441 || .837 || 1.5 || 1.7 || .4 || .1 || 8.2

Playoffs

|-
| style="text-align:left;"| 1993
| style="text-align:left;"| New York
| 7 || 0 || 13.7 || .560 || .500 || .667 || .9 || .7 || .9 || .0 || 4.4
|-
| style="text-align:left;"| 1994
| style="text-align:left;"| New York
| 23 || 7 || 17.2 || .364 || .286 || .719 || .9 || 1.1 || .2 || .1 || 5.3
|-
| style="text-align:left;"| 1995
| style="text-align:left;"| New York
| 11 || 0 || 16.7 || .357 || .370 || 1.000 || .6 || .8 || .1 || .5 || 4.2
|-
| style="text-align:left;"| 1996
| style="text-align:left;"| New York
| 8 || 0 || 18.1 || .548 || .526 || .818 || 1.5 || .6 || .0 || .0 || 6.6
|- class="sortbottom"
| style="text-align:center;" colspan="2"| Career
| 49 || 7 || 16.8 || .409 || .373 || .750 || .9 || .9 || .2 || .2 || 5.1

College

|-
| style="text-align:left;"|1988–89
| style="text-align:left;"|North Carolina
| 35 || 0 || 7.1 || .512 || .308 || .774 || .8 || .3 || .1 || .0 || 3.3
|-
| style="text-align:left;"|1989–90
| style="text-align:left;"|North Carolina
| 34 || 6 || 21.3 || .446 || .396 || .797 || 1.8 || 1.5 || 1.0 || .2 || 9.6
|-
| style="text-align:left;"|1990–91
| style="text-align:left;"|North Carolina
| 35 || 20 || 24.3 || .521 || .489 || .835 || 2.4 || 1.9 || .9 || .3 || 13.3
|-
| style="text-align:left;"|1991–92
| style="text-align:left;"|North Carolina
| 33 || 30 || 33.2 || .508 || .429 || .828 || 2.3 || 1.6 || 1.3 || .2 || 21.4
|- class="sortbottom"
| style="text-align:center;" colspan="2"|Career
| 137 || 56 || 21.3 || .498 || .435 || .819 || 1.8 || 1.3 || .8 || .2 || 11.8

Records
New York Knicks single-season 3-point field goal percentage (.476)
Dallas Mavericks single-season 3-point field goal percentage (.491)

Head coaching record

References

External links
NBA.com profile
North Carolina Tar Heels profile

1970 births
Living people
20th-century African-American sportspeople
21st-century African-American sportspeople
African-American basketball players
American expatriate basketball people in Canada
American men's basketball players
Basketball coaches from North Carolina
Basketball players from Winston-Salem, North Carolina
College basketball announcers in the United States
College men's basketball head coaches in the United States
Dallas Mavericks players
Detroit Pistons players
New Jersey Nets players
New York Knicks draft picks
New York Knicks players
North Carolina Tar Heels men's basketball coaches
North Carolina Tar Heels men's basketball players
Shooting guards
Toronto Raptors players
Universiade gold medalists for the United States
Universiade medalists in basketball
Washington Wizards players